Marcello Mihalich (12 March 1907 – 27 October 1996) was an Italian professional football player and coach who played as a midfielder.

Honours
Juventus
 Serie A champion: 1933–34.

References

External links

 

1907 births
1996 deaths
Italian footballers
Italy international footballers
Serie A players
U.S. Fiumana players
S.S.C. Napoli players
Inter Milan players
Juventus F.C. players
U.S. Pistoiese 1921 players
Catania S.S.D. players
Italian football managers
Istrian Italian people

Association football midfielders
Italian people of Croatian descent